Oslo Skøiteklub (OSK) is a sports club in Oslo. Its home arena is Frogner Stadion. The club has departments for speed skating and figure skating.

Establishment

Christiania Skøiteklub - later Kristiania Skøiteklub (KSK) - was founded 18 February 1864. The formation of the club was a spin-off from a skating competition on fjord ice in the Oslo Fjord 1 March 1863. The skating sport was quite popular at the time, and the club had about 1000 members after two years, and more than 5000 members in 1870, when Christiania had less than 70000 inhabitants. In 1924, the club changed its name to Oslo Skøiteklub.

Arena
The first skating activities were done on sea ice, outside Vippetangen or in Frognerkilen. Also, Tullinløkken and the Majorstuen stadium were used for skating competitions and performances. In 1901 the club's new stadium opened at Frogner, and this soon became the most important skating arena in Oslo and Norway. Because of the 1914 Jubilee Exhibition in Kristiania, another stadium was built north of the first one. At this stadium a long series of international championships were organized, in both speed skating and figure skating.

Prominent skaters

The first stars of the club were Axel Paulsen, inventor of the Axel jump in 1882, who competed in both figure skating and speed skating, and speed skater Rudolf Gundersen. From 1907 and onwards Oscar Mathisen was KSK's big star. In the 1920s Bernt Evensen won several championship titles and Olympic medals for OSK. The club also fostered the figure skater Sonja Henie, who won three successive Olympic Championships, and ten World Championships.

During the 1930s Oslo Skøiteklub played an important role in organizing speed skating for women. Several women who dominated the sport in the 1930s were members of OSK: Synnøve Lie, Undis Blikken and Laila Schou Nilsen.

After the Second World War skaters as Roald Aas and Svein-Erik Stiansen won titles for the club.

Oscar Mathiesen Award 
In 1959 Oslo Skøiteklub introduced the Oscar Mathisen Award to commemorate the speed skater Oscar Mathisen (1888–1954). The winner is awarded a miniature of sculptor Arne Durban's statue of Oscar Mathisen. The statue is placed outside Frogner Stadion in Oslo.

Notable club members
Axel Paulsen
Rudolf Gundersen
Oscar Mathisen
Bernt Evensen
Michael Staksrud
Roald Larsen
Sonja Henie
Ivar Ballangrud
Synnøve Lie
Laila Schou Nilsen
Finn Helgesen
Roald Aas
Nils Aaness
Svein-Erik Stiansen
Lasse Efskind

National presidents
These presidents of the Norwegian Skating Association represented Kristiania SK or Oslo SK:

1898–1900 : Henrik Olsen Biørn Homan
1903–1903 : Karl Ingvar Nandrup
1904–1906 : Ivar Hellesnes
1906–1907 : Christopher Fougner
1908–1911 : Aksel Gresvig
1911–1915 : Ludvig Albert Thue
1915–1916 : Aksel Gresvig
1918–1919 : Knut Ørn Meinich
1922–1925 : Knut Ørn Meinich
1925–1926 : Ivar Hellesnes
1926–1927 : Yngvar Bryn
1931–1931 : Oskar Viktor Olsen
1932–1937 : Gerhard Karlsen
1938–1940 : Henning August Olsen
1949–1952 : Oskar Viktor Olsen
1952–1954 : Harald Halvorsen
1956–1961 : Armand Carlsen
1965–1966 : Roald Vatn
1966–1969 : Willy Reisvang
1973–1975 : Kjell Trystad
1999–2001 : Finn Arne Bakke

References 

Figure skating clubs in Norway
Speed skating clubs in Norway
Sport in Oslo
Sports clubs established in 1864
1864 establishments in Norway